The Geneva Conventions Act 1957 is an Act of Parliament of the United Kingdom that incorporates the provisions of the Geneva Conventions into British law.

One aspect of the Geneva Conventions Act is that it makes wearing the Red Cross symbol illegal in many circumstances, sometimes with curious consequences. In 2011, a British pantomime costume had to be changed in order to comply with the Geneva Conventions Act.

Its provisions were later amended by the Geneva Conventions (Amendment) Act 1995 and Geneva Conventions and United Nations Personnel (Protocols) Act 2009.

See also 
 Geneva Conventions (Amendment) Act 1995
 Geneva Conventions and United Nations Personnel (Protocols) Act 2009

References

External links 
 legislation.gov.uk page for the Geneva Conventions Act 1957

Criminal law of the United Kingdom
United Kingdom Acts of Parliament 1957
National laws incorporating the Geneva Conventions